In Maori mythology, Tane-Rore is the personification of shimmering air as he performs a haka for his mother Hine-raumati.

Family 
Tama-nui-te-ra had two wives, Hine-takurua and Hine-raumati. The child of Tama-nui-te-ra and Hine-raumati, Tane-rore is credited with the origin of dance.

The 'wiri trembling hand action performed during the haka dance is a physical representation of the shimmering heat referred to in many different hakas around the motu but the main haka would refer to " Te haka a Tane Rore"

It is Maori belief that on occasions when the land is so hot that the air shimmers, you can see Tane-rore perform a haka for his mother. The wiriwiri'' or shimmering air is reminiscent of his trembling hand actions.

References
 
 

Māori gods
Sky and weather gods